Chris Black is a screenwriter and television producer, from Toledo, Ohio. Black is known for writing and producing mainly science fiction and action series, although he also was a part of the production team of the comedy-drama Desperate Housewives during its first two seasons.

Black has produced and written episodes of Cleopatra 2525, The Huntress, Sliders, Star Trek: Enterprise, Hawaii and Standoff. In addition, he has written episodes of several other shows, including Weird Science, Xena: Warrior Princess and Vanished. He also co-wrote the 1997 action movie Masterminds starring Patrick Stewart.

In 2022, Black and Matt Fraction co-created Godzilla and the Titans for Apple TV+. Black also serves as showrunner.

References

External links
 

American male screenwriters
Year of birth missing (living people)
Living people
American television producers
American soap opera writers
American male television writers